Hartford (also Old Hartford) is an unincorporated community in Pulaski County, Georgia, United States. It lies a short distance east of the city of Hawkinsville, the county seat of Pulaski County. Hartford sits at the intersection of Alternate U.S. Route 129 with State Routes 26, 27,  230, 257, and U.S. Route 341. Its elevation is 256 feet (78 m).

The community was named after Nancy Hart. Hartford served as seat of Pulaski County from the formation of the county in 1809 until 1836 when the seat was transferred to Hawkinsville.

See also
 List of county seats in Georgia (U.S. state)

References

Unincorporated communities in Pulaski County, Georgia
Unincorporated communities in Georgia (U.S. state)
Former county seats in Georgia (U.S. state)